Mitchell Krueger and Daniel Nguyen were the defending champions but chose not to defend their title.

Luke Bambridge and David O'Hare won the title after defeating Yusuke Takahashi and Renta Tokuda 6–2, 6–2 in the final.

Seeds

Draw

References
 Main Draw

Winnipeg National Bank Challenger
Winnipeg Challenger